Nealyda is a genus of moths in the family Gelechiidae.

Species
Nealyda accincta Meyrick, 1923
Nealyda bicolor (Walsingham, [1892])
Nealyda bifidella Dietz, 1900
Nealyda bougainvilleae Hering, 1955
Nealyda kinzelella Busck, 1900
Nealyda leucozostra Meyrick, 1923
Nealyda neopisoniae Clarke, 1946
Nealyda panchromatica (Meyrick, 1926)
Nealyda phytolaccae Clarke, 1946
Nealyda pisoniae Busck, 1900

References

 
Anomologini